The Henley River is a river in Kenora District in Northwestern Ontario, Canada. The river is in the Hudson Bay drainage basin and is a left tributary of the Albany River.

See also
List of rivers of Ontario

References

Sources

Rivers of Kenora District
Tributaries of Hudson Bay